This is a list of monuments that are classified by the Moroccan ministry of culture around Mehdya.

Monuments and sites in Mehdya 

|}

References 

Mehdya
Kénitra Province